Hice is a surname. Notable people with the surname include:

Eddie Hice (1930–2015), American stuntman and actor 
Herbert Hice Whetzel (1877–1944), American plant pathologist and mycologist
Jody Hice (born 1960), American politician, radio host, and political activist

See also
Rice (surname)